Croal may refer to:

River Croal, a river in Greater Manchester, England

Surname
Jimmy Croal, Scottish football player
N'Gai Croal, video game critic and consultant